Ceylon Covered Bridge is a historic covered bridge over the Wabash River and located at Wabash Township, Adams County, Indiana. It was built in 1879 by the Smith Bridge Company of Toledo, Ohio, and is a  truss bridge. It the only remaining covered bridge over the Wabash.

It was listed on the National Register of Historic Places in 2007.

See also
List of bridges documented by the Historic American Engineering Record in Indiana

References

External links

Covered bridges on the National Register of Historic Places in Indiana
Bridges completed in 1879
Historic American Engineering Record in Indiana
Transportation buildings and structures in Adams County, Indiana
National Register of Historic Places in Adams County, Indiana
Road bridges on the National Register of Historic Places in Indiana
1879 establishments in Indiana
Wooden bridges in Indiana
Howe truss bridges in the United States